Tigist Shibabaw (1980 –January 2008) was an Ethiopian singer and one of the original members of the Harlem-based hip hop fusion band Bole2Harlem. She was born in Chagni, Ethiopia, like her sister, the singer Gigi.

Early life
Tigist was born and raised in Chagni, a small town in northwestern Ethiopia. She was one of ten siblings, born into a family of coffee farmers who relied on the local river for their harvest. According to her sister Gigi, their household was always filled with entertainment, and the children of the house were often recruited to entertain guests.

Career
Tigist immigrated to the United States in 2000 to pursue a career in music, joining her older sister Gigi, who was already a globally acclaimed musician in her own right. Their father had initially forbidden Gigi from becoming an entertainer.

Tigist performed with her sister Gigi on Gigi's debut album; she then became a lead vocalist for Bole2Harlem. The group's co-founder and producer David Schommer described her voice and singing as "a vital part of Bole2Harlem's sound."

Death
Tigist died at the age of twenty-eight in Bahar Dar, Ethiopia, where she is said to have traveled on a pilgrimage shortly after she finished recording with Bole2Harlem circa January 2008. Details regarding the circumstances surrounding her death never emerged, including the exact date of her death; fans mourned her passing when they learned the news. She was buried among family in Chagni, the town where she was born.

Discography

References

1980 births
2008 deaths
21st-century Ethiopian women singers
Date of birth missing
Date of death missing